Leaded copper is a metal alloy of copper with lead. A small amount of lead makes the copper easier to machine. Alloys with a larger amount of lead are used for bearings. Brass and bronze alloys of copper may have lead added and are then also sometimes referred to as leaded copper alloys. Leaded copper and its alloys have been used since ancient times.

Applications

Leaded copper alloys are used to make electrical connectors and mechanical bearings, especially in the automotive industry where high performance and reliability are required. Mechanical bearings can have high lead content. Such high lead content alloys are unsuitable for welding or brazing.

Machined alloys
Alloys with around 2-4% lead are used for machined copper applications, where the lead content lubricates the copper and makes it easier to machine. These include high-quality electrical connectors where a high current capacity and low electrical resistance are required. Such connectors are used in industrial automation and the automotive industry. Brasses (copper alloyed with zinc) may also be leaded for the same reason.

Cast and sintered alloys
High-strength casting copper alloys typically contain less than 2% lead. Bearing alloys are often cast or sintered onto a steel backing. Softer alloys with a higher lead content are also used, for example in bushes where conformance to the opposite bearing surface is important.

Some casting alloys have over 20% lead content but, due to their toxicity, they are no longer used.

Toxicity
When lead alloys wear, lead is released into the environment. Lead is a heavy metal toxin and in recent times the use of leaded copper alloys has been reduced.

History
Signs of leaded copper use are found in the manufacture of ancient Egyptian faience. By 1500 BC leaded copper could be found across the Old World from East Asia to Africa and Europe.

Enigmatic entries in a Chinese manuscript, the Kao Gong Ji dating from around 300 BC, were deciphered by scholars in 2022, and seem to indicate that a pre-prepared copper-lead alloy named Xi may have been used in the preparation of ancient bronzes. Another copper-tin-lead alloy named Jin was also tentatively identified as a pre-prepared component of Chinese bronzes. This part of the manuscript relates to an attempt to standardise the quality of bronze manufacture.

References

Notes

Bibliography
Aalco brochure, Pages 70-85.
Jean-Marie Welter; Leaded Copper Alloys for Automotive Applications: A Scrutiny, European Copper Institute, 2014.

Copper alloys
Lead alloys